The English rock group The Pretty Things have released 14 studio albums, 14 live albums, 32 compilation albums, 7 extended play singles, and 34 singles.

Studio albums

Live albums

Electric Banana

Electric Banana was a pseudonymous 1967 album of the band. When the album was released, the stage name the Electric Banana was used to hide the band's identity. The band recorded this album and four subsequent ones for the De Wolfe Music Library.  De Wolfe provided stock music for film soundtracks.  The Electric Banana music wound up on various horror and soft-porn films of the late 1960s. Films which have used their music include What's Good for the Goose (1969).  The song "It'll Never Be Me" featured in the 1973 Doctor Who story The Green Death.  The song "Cause I'm a Man" appeared in George A. Romero's horror classic Dawn of the Dead (1978) and was reissued on Trunk Records' 2004 compilation album Dawn of the Dead: The Unreleased Incidental Music.

Stock music albums

Compilation albums
Other compilation albums of these recordings have been released under "The Pretty Things" name, see below.

Collaborative albums

Compilation albums

EPs

Singles

Other releases

Notes

References

External links
 

Discography
Discographies of British artists
Rock music group discographies